This article lists the administrative divisions of the Chechnya, Russia.

Cities of republican significance:
Grozny (Грозный) (capital)
Argun (Аргун)
Gudermes (Гудермес)
Towns of district significance:
Shali (Шали)
Urus-Martan (Урус-Мартан)
Kurchaloy (Курчалой)
Districts:
Achkhoy-Martanovsky (Ачхой-Мартановский)
Groznensky (Грозненский)
Gudermessky (Гудермесский)
Itum-Kalinsky (Итум-Калинский)
Kurchaloyevsky (Курчалоевский)
Nadterechny (Надтеречный)
Naursky (Наурский)
Nozhay-Yurtovsky (Ножай-Юртовский)
Sernovodsky (Серноводский)
Shalinsky (Шалинский)
Sharoysky (Шаройский)
Shatoysky (Шатойский)
Shelkovskoy (Шелковской)
Urus-Martanovsky (Урус-Мартановский)
Vedensky (Веденский)

Cheberloyevsky and Galanchozhsky Districts were re-introduced into the Constitution of the Chechen Republic in November 2012 (after having been removed in December 2007); however, as of 2020, their borders and composition have not been officially defined.

Chechnya
Chechnya